Vargas Ochagavía was a Spanish haute couture firm made up by couturiers Jesús Vargas (1913-n.a.) and Emilio Ochagavía (1922-1996). The firm opened in 1946, presented its first collection in 1948 and was running until 1987. It was a member of the  until 1970.

Their garments were dressed by actresses such as Sara Montiel, Celia Gámez, Carmen Sevilla, Paquita Rico and Sophia Loren and socialites like Fabiola de Mora y Aragón.

They also worked for films such as Death of a Cyclist (1955), The Violet Seller (1958), Where Are You Going, Alfonso XII? (1958), Cabriola (1965), Más bonita que ninguna (1965) and Esa mujer (1969).

Gallery

References

Haute couture
Spanish brands
Clothing companies established in 1946
Companies based in Madrid
Clothing companies of Spain
Spanish companies established in 1946